Astroblepus pirrensis is a species of catfish of the family Astroblepidae. It can be found on Central America.

References

Bibliography
Eschmeyer, William N., ed. 1998. Catalog of Fishes. Special Publication of the Center for Biodiversity Research and Information, num. 1, vol. 1–3. California Academy of Sciences. San Francisco, California, United States. 2905. .

Astroblepus
Fish of Central America
Fish described in 1913